The UTEP Miners football team began playing in 1914.

Seasons

Notes

References 

UTEP

UTEP Miners football seasons